The 2009 Vuelta al Táchira is the 44th of the annual Vuelta al Táchira cycling competition.  The race was held in San Cristóbal, Táchira from January 6 to January 17, 2009, on a  course.

Final classification

See also
2009 Vuelta a Venezuela

References
cyclingnews

2009
Venezuela
Táchira